The 1979–80 Cypriot First Division was the 41st season of the Cypriot top-level football league.

Overview
It was contested by 15 teams, and APOEL F.C. won the championship.

League standings

Results

See also
 Cypriot First Division
 1979–80 Cypriot Cup
 List of top goalscorers in Cypriot First Division by season
 Cypriot football clubs in European competitions

References

Sources

Cypriot First Division seasons
Cyprus
1979–80 in Cypriot football